Kanefer was a High Priest of Ptah in Memphis from the reign of Sahure in the Fifth Dynasty of Egypt.

Items from Kanefer's tomb are known from museum. Two offering tables exist at the British Museum and Ny Carlsberg Glyptotek of Copenhagen respectively.

A statue group of Kanefer, his wife Tjentety and their son Khuwyptah is in the Kimbell Art Museum. Kanefer is shown seated with his wife kneeling by his left leg and his son leaning against his right leg. Kanefer has the titles Overseer of the Craftsmen, Priest of Ptah, while his wife is a Royal Confidant. Kanefer's son Kuwyptah was also a High Priest of Ptah.

See also
 Kanefer, a prince with the same name

References

Memphis High Priests of Ptah
People of the Fifth Dynasty of Egypt